Muztagh Ata or Muztagata (Музтағ Ата, literally "ice-mountain-father"; ; formerly known as Mount Tagharma or Taghalma and Wi-tagh) is the second highest (7546 metres) of the mountains which form the northern edge of the Tibetan Plateau in China (not the second highest of the mountains of the Tibetan Plateau). It is sometimes regarded as being part of the Kunlun Mountains, although physically it is more closely connected to the Pamirs. It is also one of the relatively easier 7,000 m peaks in the world to climb, due to its gentle western slope and the comparatively drier weather of Xinjiang, though a thorough acclimatization period and a very strong physical condition are crucial for success.

Location
Muztagh Ata lies just south of Kongur Tagh, the highest peak of this somewhat isolated range that is separated from the main chain of the Kunlun by the large Yarkand River valley, and thus generally included in the "Eastern Pamirs". Not far to the north and east of this group are the lowlands of the Tarim Basin and the Taklamakan Desert. The Karakoram Highway passes very close to both peaks as well as Karakul Lake, from which the mountain is conveniently viewed. The closest city is to the mountain is Tashkurgan, the westernmost town in China and very close to the border with Tajikistan and Pakistan.

History
According to Michael Witzel: 

The Swedish explorer and geographer Sven Hedin made the first recorded attempt to climb Muztagh Ata, in 1894. On his first expedition in 1900 Aurel Stein reached the summit while crossing the Karakorum Pass. Additional attempts were made in 1900, 1904 and 1947, the last by the team of Eric Shipton and Bill Tilman who came very close to the summit but were turned back due to cold and deep snow.

The first ascent of the peak was in 1956 by a large party of Chinese and Soviet climbers (including Liu Lianman and Xu Jing) led by E.A. Beletskiy, via the west ridge, which is now the standard route.

Since the first ascent, many ascents of Muztagh Ata have been made. An ascent of the much harder south-east ridge was made in 2000  and a secondary route at the west side of the mountain was first climbed in the summer of 2005. In 2011 the Swedish climber Anneli Wester camped on the summit overnight after climbing the mountain solo and alpine style.

Notes

Sources
 Jill Neate, High Asia: An Illustrated History of the 7000 Metre Peaks, .
 Himalayan Index

External links

 Muztagh Ata on summitpost.org (much information)
 Muztagh ata Information
   muztagh ata  informations
  Muztagh Ata in Kyrgyzstan 

Mountains of Xinjiang
Seven-thousanders of the Pamir
Tashkurgan Tajik Autonomous County